Anbar Qanbar (also Romanized as ‘Anbar Qanbar; also known as Qanbar ‘Anbar) is a village in Fazl Rural District, Zarrin Dasht District, Nahavand County, Hamadan Province, Iran. In the 2006 census, its population was 155 families, comprising 643 individuals .

References 

Populated places in Nahavand County